Comet Lake is Intel's codename for its 10th generation Core microprocessors. They are manufactured using Intel's third 14 nm Skylake process refinement, succeeding the Whiskey Lake U-series mobile processor and Coffee Lake desktop processor families. Intel announced low-power mobile Comet Lake-U CPUs on August 21, 2019, H-series mobile CPUs on April 2, 2020, desktop Comet Lake-S CPUs  April 30, 2020, and Xeon W-1200 series workstation CPUs on May 13, 2020. Comet Lake processors and Ice Lake 10 nm processors are together branded as the Intel "10th Generation Core" family. Intel officially launched Comet Lake-Refresh CPUs on the same day as 11th Gen Core Rocket Lake launch. The low-power mobile Comet Lake-U Core and Celeron 5205U CPUs were discontinued on July 7, 2021.

Generational changes 
All Comet Lake CPUs feature an updated Platform Controller Hub with CNVio2 controller with Wi-Fi 6 and external AX201 CRF module support.

Comet Lake-S compared to Coffee Lake-S Refresh
 Up to ten CPU cores
 Hyperthreading on all models, except for Celeron
 Single core turbo boost up to 5.3 GHz (300 MHz higher); all-core turbo boost up to 4.9 GHz; Thermal Velocity Boost for Core i9; Turbo Boost Max 3.0 support for Core i7, i9
 DDR4-2933 memory support for Core i7 and i9; DDR4-2666 for Core i3, Core i5, Pentium Gold, Celeron
 400-series chipset based on the LGA 1200 socket

Comet Lake-H compared to Coffee Lake-H Refresh
 Higher turbo frequencies by up to 300 Mhz
 DDR4-2933 memory support
 Thermal Velocity Boost for Core i7 and i9

Comet Lake-U compared to Whiskey Lake-U
 Up to six CPU cores
 Higher turbo frequencies by up to 300 MHz
 DDR4-2666 and LPDDR3-2133 memory support

One notable architectural change of Comet Lake from its predecessors is removal of TSX instruction set extensions.

Entry-level CPUs like the i3 series no longer support ECC memory.

List of 10th generation Comet Lake processors

Desktop processors  
Pentium and Celeron CPUs lack AVX and AVX2 support.

The i9-10900K and 10900KF support Thermal Velocity Boost up to 5.3 GHz. The i9-10900, i9-10900F and i9-10850K support Thermal Velocity Boost up to 5.2 GHz.

Workstation processors 
Comet Lake-W CPUs require W480 chipset.

Xeon W-1290 and W-1290P support Thermal Velocity Boost up to 5.2 GHz and 5.3 GHz respectively.

Mobile processors

H-series (High power) 
Core i5 CPUs lack Thermal Velocity Boost.

U-series (Medium power) 
The following SKUs additionally support Intel vPro and LPDDR4-2933 memory: i5-10310U, i7-10610U, i7-10810U.

Pentium and Celeron CPUs lack AVX2 support.

List of 10th generation Comet Lake Refresh processors

Desktop processors  
On March 16, 2021, Intel announced the refreshed models of Comet Lake Core i3 and Pentium Gold processors. These processors have the same characteristics as their original parts, albeit with a 100MHz higher frequency and the last digit changing from zero to five.

Notes

References 

Intel microarchitectures
Intel x86 microprocessors